Adaptor-associated protein kinase 1 also known as AP2-associated protein kinase 1 is an enzyme that in humans is encoded by the AAK1 gene and is involved in clathrin mediated endocytosis. Alternatively spliced transcript variants have been described, but their biological validity has not been determined.

Function 

Adaptor-related protein complex 2 (AP-2 complexes) functions during receptor-mediated endocytosis to trigger clathrin assembly, interact with membrane-bound receptors, and recruit endocytic accessory factors. This gene encodes a member of the SNF1 subfamily of Ser/Thr protein kinases. The protein interacts with and phosphorylates a subunit of the AP-2 complex, which promotes binding of AP-2 to sorting signals found in membrane-bound receptors and subsequent receptor endocytosis. Its kinase activity is stimulated by clathrin.

References

Further reading

External links